Renqingxiubu , or Renqingxiubucuo, also known as Rinchen Shubtso, is a salt lake in Zhongba County in the Shigatse Prefecture of the Tibet Autonomous Region of China. It is located about 45 kilometres northwest of Taruo Lake and southeast of Ang Laren Lake. It is 21.5 km long and 16.4 km wide and has an area of 187.1 square km.

References

Shigatse
Lakes of Tibet